Kenn Woodard (born 1961) is an American actor.

Career
Woodard started acting at the age of fourteen in his home state of Louisiana. He began his professional career on the New York stage as Poe, in the Writer's Theater production of The Raven, about the life of Edgar Allan Poe and has continued his professional work in both national and international media markets.

Trivia
 Kenn is a certified hypnotherapist, writer, director, producer, and poet. His life is dedicated to using the arts as a collaborative tapestry of collective healing.

Filmography
 The Sowers (2012) (short)
 
 Duel of Legends (2012) as Rooftop Guard 2
 Will to Power - The Perfect Murder (2008) as Mr. Conner
 Night Watcher (2008) as Brent King
 The Gift (2008) as Father
 The Ruby Scorpion (2007) as James
 Lake Dead (2007) as Priest
 Ng (2006) (short) as Leonard Lake
 The Executives (2006) as John LaSalle
 The Erotic Samurai (2006) as Jake Boughnect P.I.
 Expert Insight: Beating Blackjack (2006) (documentary) as Griff
 MUD (2005) as Kevin
 Breaking in Unlocked Doors (2005) as Daddy
 Guiana 1838 (2004) as Thomas

References

External links

www.facebook.com/kenn.woodard

American male film actors
American male stage actors
1961 births
Living people
Male actors from Louisiana